Sibopirdine, also known as EXP921, is a nootropic drug.

Synthesis

4,5-Diazafluoren-9-one was the starting material.

See also 
 Besipirdine
 Linopirdine

References 

Nootropics
4-Pyridyl compounds